Van Dijck is a Dutch toponymic surname meaning "from (the) dike". The more common form Van Dijk uses the modern spelling of "dike". The form Van Dyck reflects a common replacement of the original IJ digraph with a Y.

Notable people with the surname 
Abraham van Dijck (1635–1680), Dutch Golden Age painter
Antoon van Dijck (1599–1641), Flemish painter in England, better known as Anthony van Dyck
Christoffel van Dijck (1605–1669), Dutch printer and type designer
Edward Van Dijck (1918–1977), Belgian cyclist
Erica van Dijck (born 1966), Dutch badminton player
Floris van Dijck (1575–1651), Dutch painter
Hendrik Van Dijck (born 1974), Belgian cyclist
José van Dijck (born 1960), Dutch professor
Kris Van Dijck (born 1963), Belgian politician
Raymond Van Dijck (1935–1997), Belgian pole vaulter
Sander van Dijck (born 1990), Dutch music producer, known more commonly as San Holo.
Teun van Dijck (born 1963), Dutch politician
William Van Dijck (born 1961), Belgian long-distance runner

See also
Van Dijk
Van Dyck (surname)
8205 Van Dijck, main-belt asteroid

Dutch-language surnames
Surnames of Dutch origin